Short stories are pieces of prose fiction.

Short Stories may also refer to:
Short Stories (magazine), an American pulp magazine published from 1890 to 1959
Short Stories, a 1954 collection by O. E. Middleton
Short Stories (Harry Chapin album), 1974
Short Stories (The Statler Brothers album), 1977
Short Stories (Jon & Vangelis album), 1980
Short Stories (Tuxedomoon album), 1982
Short Stories (EP), a 1983 EP by American post-punk band Tuxedomoon
Short Stories (Kenny Rogers album), 1985
Short Stories (Kronos Quartet), 1993
Short Stories (Miyuki Nakajima album), 2000
Short Stories (Elisabeth Andreassen album), 2005
Short Stories (film), 2012 Russian film

See also
Short Story (disambiguation)